The 1967 Texas A&M Aggies football team represented Texas A&M University in the 1967 NCAA University Division football season as a member of the Southwest Conference (SWC). The Aggies were led by head coach Gene Stallings in his third season and finished with a record of seven wins and four losses (7–4 overall, 6–1 in the SWC), as Southwest Conference champions and with a victory in the Cotton Bowl Classic over Alabama.

Schedule

Roster
QB Edd Hargett, Jr.
LB Bill Hobbs
DB Curley Hallman, Jr.

OT Dan Schneider, Trafford High

References

Texas AandM
Texas A&M Aggies football seasons
Southwest Conference football champion seasons
Cotton Bowl Classic champion seasons
Texas AandM Aggies football